Prince Richard may refer to:

 Richard of Shrewsbury, Duke of York (1473–)
 Prince Richard von Metternich (1829–1895), from the German House of Metternich
 Prince Richard of Sayn-Wittgenstein-Berleburg (1934–2017), from the German House of Sayn-Wittgenstein
 Prince Richard, Duke of Gloucester (born 1944)

See also
 Richard Prince (disambiguation)
 Princess Richard, wife of Prince Richard, Duke of Gloucester